Arif Ahmed is a Bangladeshi cricketer. He made his first-class debut for Chittagong Division in the 2001–02 National Cricket League. He scored his maiden first-class century in the 2003–04 National Cricket League.

References

External links
 

Year of birth missing (living people)
Living people
Bangladeshi cricketers
Chittagong Division cricketers
Place of birth missing (living people)